Dangram Sangota (Pashto: ،دنګرام سنګوټه) is an administrative unit, known as Union council in Tehsil Babuzai, or Wards of Swat District in the Khyber Pakhtunkhwa province of Pakistan.

According to Khyber Pakhtunkhwa Local Government Act 2013. District Swat has 67 Wards, of which total amount of Village Councils is 170, and Neighbourhood Councils is 44.

Dangram Sangota is Territorial  Ward, which is further divided in three Village Councils:
 Dangram (Village Council)
 Lowey Banr, Ajrang (Village Council)
 Sangota (Village Council)

See also 
 Babuzai
 Swat District

References

External links
Khyber-Pakhtunkhwa Government website section on Lower Dir
United Nations
Hajjinfo.org Uploads
 PBS paiman.jsi.com

Swat District
Populated places in Swat District
Union councils of Khyber Pakhtunkhwa
Union Councils of Swat District